This is the discography of American rock band Little Feat.

Albums

Studio albums

Live albums

Compilation albums

Box sets

Video albums

Singles

References

Discographies of American artists
Rock music group discographies